The Clemson Tigers men's basketball teams of 1940–1949 represented Clemson Agricultural College in NCAA college basketball competition.

1939–40

1940–41

1941–42

1942–43

1943–44

1944–45

1945–46

1946–47

1947–48

1948–49

References

Games: 
Coaches: 

1940